Pramod Chakravorty (15 August 1929 – 12 December 2004) was an Indian Hindi film producer and director.

Career
Chakravorty is best known for directing Hindi film classics like Ziddi, Love in Tokyo, Tumse Achcha Kaun Hai in romantic genre and action films like Jugnu (1973), Jagir and Shatru. He also directed suspense films like 12 O Clock with Guru Dutt and Johnny Walker and also directed thriller like Passport with Madhubala and Pradeep Kumar in lead roles. He directed Dharmendra and Hema Malini as the romantic pair in the films Jugnu, Naya Zamana, Dream Girl and Azaad. Most of  his directorial ventures were hits with exception of Gangu (1962), Deedaar, and Barood (1998) which were box office flops. In 1976, he had started shooting the film Chamatkar with Rajesh Khanna, Parveen Babi and Shoma Anand in lead roles but the film after being shot for 45 percent, was stopped mid way by other producers. Later he got opportunity to direct Rajesh Khanna with Shabana in the Indo Bangladesh venture Shatru (1986). He also directed Dev Anand and Zeenat Aman in Warrant in 1975. He is the director who first signed Akshay Kumar as lead hero with Deedar even though Saugandh was Akshay's first release. Actor Pran was a regular in the films directed by Pramod Chakravorthy. 16 of his directorial ventures were box office hits.

Personal life
Pramod Chakravorty was born on 15 August 1929 in West Bengal, India. 
He became a producer in the 1958 with the film 12 O'Clock.

Filmography as director

12 O'Clock (1958)
Sanjog (1961)
Passport (1961)
Ziddi (1964)
Love in Tokyo (1966)
Tumse Achha Kaun Hai (1969)
Naya Zamana (1971)
Jugnu (1973)
Warrant (1975)
Barood (1976)
Dream Girl (1977)
Azaad (1978)
Jyoti (1981)
Nastik (1983)
Jagir (1984)
Shatru (1986)
Deedar (1992)
Barood (1998)

See also
Bollywood
R.D. Burman
Shankar Jaikishan

References

External links
 

Hindi-language film directors
Film directors from West Bengal
1929 births
2004 deaths
20th-century Indian film directors